Nuggets may refer to:

Music 
 Nuggets (series), a series of compilation albums by Elektra Records, continued by Rhino
 Nuggets: Original Artyfacts from the First Psychedelic Era, 1965–1968
 Nuggets II: Original Artyfacts from the British Empire and Beyond, 1964–1969, a Rhino Records box set 
 Children of Nuggets: Original Artyfacts from the Second Psychedelic Era, 1976–1995, the third box set
 Love Is the Song We Sing: San Francisco Nuggets 1965–1970, the fourth box 
 Where the Action Is! Los Angeles Nuggets: 1965–1968, the fifth box set
 Nuggets, Volume 7: Early San Francisco, a compilation album of American psychedelic rock and folk rock
 Nuggets, Vol. 9: Acid Rock, a compilation album

Sports
 Denver Nuggets, basketball team
 Montana Golden Nuggets, a former Continental Basketball Association team
 Otago Nuggets, a New Zealand basketball team

Other 
 Nuggets (film), a 2014 animated short film
 The Nuggets, Tasmanian island
 The Nuggets (New Zealand), a group of islets in New Zealand
 Golden Nuggets, a breakfast cereal
 Chicken nuggets
 McNuggets, food

See also 
 Nugget (disambiguation)